The Black Sea deluge is the best known of three hypothetical flood scenarios proposed for the Late Quaternary history of the Black Sea. It is one of two of these flood scenarios which proposes a rapid, even catastrophic, rise in sea level of the Black Sea.

History

In 1997, William Ryan, Walter Pitman, Petko Dimitrov, and their colleagues first published the Black Sea deluge hypothesis. They proposed that a catastrophic inflow of Mediterranean seawater into the Black Sea freshwater lake occurred around 7600 years ago, .

As proposed, the Early Holocene Black Sea flood scenario describes events that would have profoundly affected prehistoric settlement in eastern Europe and adjacent parts of Asia and possibly was the basis of oral history concerning Noah's flood. Some archaeologists support this theory as an explanation for the lack of Neolithic sites in northern Turkey. In 2003, Ryan and coauthors revised the dating of the early Holocene flood to 8800 years ago, .

Before that date, glacial meltwater had turned the Black and Caspian seas into vast freshwater lakes draining into the Aegean Sea. As glaciers retreated, some of the rivers emptying into the Black Sea declined in volume and changed course to drain into the North Sea. The levels of the lakes dropped through evaporation, while changes in worldwide hydrology caused global sea levels to rise.

The rising Mediterranean finally spilled over a rocky sill at the Bosporus. The event flooded  of land and significantly expanded the Black Sea shoreline to the north and west. According to these researchers,  of water poured through each day, two hundred times the flow of Niagara Falls. The Bosporus valley roared and surged at full spate for at least three hundred days. They argued that the catastrophic inflow of seawater resulted from an abrupt sea-level jump that accompanied the Laurentide Ice Sheet collapse and the ensuing breach of a bedrock barrier in the Bosporus strait.

Popular press accounts
Popular discussion of this early Holocene Black Sea flood scenario was headlined in The New York Times in December 1996 and later published as a book.

Black Sea gradual inundation hypothesis
In addition to the early Holocene "Noah’s Flood" scenario proposed by Ryan, Pitman, Dimitrov, and their colleagues and the Caspian Sea overflow scenario of Chepalyga, the non-catastrophic progressive flood model (or gradual inflow model) has been proposed to explain the Late Quaternary sea level history of the Black Sea.

About 8,000 YBP, the level of the Marmara Sea would have risen high enough for two-way flow to start. The evidence used to support this scenario includes the disparate ages of sapropel deposition in the eastern Mediterranean Sea and Black Sea; buried back-stepping barrier islands observed on the Black Sea shelf; and an under-water delta in the Marmara Sea, near the Bosporus Strait, composed of Black Sea sediments.

Late Pleistocene Great Flood hypothesis 
In 2003 and 2007, a more ancient catastrophic flood scenario was proposed by Andrei L. Chepalyga for the Late Quaternary sea level rise of the Black Sea. The hypothesis for a Late Pleistocene Great Flood argues that brackish Neoeuxinian Lake, which occupied the Black Sea basin, was rapidly inundated by glacial meltwater overflow from the Caspian Sea via the Manych-Kerch Spillway shortly after the Late Glacial Maximum, about 17,000–14,000 BP. These extensive meltwater flooding events linked several lacustrine and marine water bodies, starting with the southern edge of the Scandinavian and southward, through spillways to the Manych-Kerch and Bosphorus, ultimately forming what has been referred to as the Cascade of Eurasian Basins. This event is argued to have caused a rapid, if not catastrophic, rise in the level of the Black Sea. It might have imposed substantial stresses upon contemporary human populations and remained in cultural memory as the Great Flood. The authors also suggested that the event might have stimulated the beginning of shipping and horse domestication.

Counter arguments  
 
Criticisms of the deluge hypothesis focus on the magnitude and pace of the water level rise in the Black Sea. With enough moderation of these features, the catastrophe hypothesis is voided. However, a few key points should be noted:
 The flood hypothesis hinges on the geomorphology of the Bosporus since the end of the glacial age. The Black Sea area has been sealed off and reconnected many times during the last 500,000 years.

Opponents of the deluge hypothesis point to clues that water was flowing out of the Black Sea basin as late as 15,000 years ago.

In this alternative scenario, much depends on the evolution of the Bosphorus. Sedimentation on these sills started before 10,000 years ago and continued until 5,300 years ago.

A large part of the academic geological community also continues to reject the idea that there could have been enough sustained long-term pressure by water from the Aegean to dig through a supposed isthmus at the present Bosphorus or enough of a difference in water levels (if at all) between the two water basins.

In 2007, a research anthology on the topic was published which makes much of the earlier Russian research available in English for the first time and combines it with more recent scientific findings.

If the flood occurred at all, the sea level increase and the flooded area during the reconnection were significantly smaller than previously proposed. The flooding could have been "not so big".

In 2011, several authors concluded that "there is no underwater archaeological evidence to support any catastrophic submergence of prehistoric Black Sea settlements during the late Pleistocene or early Holocene intervals".

A 2012 study based on process length variation of the dinoflagellate cyst Lingulodinium machaerophorum shows no evidence for catastrophic flooding. 
Geophysical, geochronological, and geochemical evidence points to a "fast transgression" of the submergence lasting between 10 and 200 years.

See also 
 
 
 
 
 
 
 
 
 , flooding of the Mediterranean

References

Further reading 
 

Dimitrov, Petko.; Dimitrov, Dimitar. 2004. The Black Sea, the flood, and the ancient myths. Varna (Bulgaria): Slavena.

National Geographic News. 2009-02-06. "Noah's Flood" Not Rooted in Reality, After All?
Nature. 2004. Noah's Flood. 430: 718–19 

Yanko-Hombach, Valentina. 2007. The Black Sea Flood Question: Changes in Coastline, Climate and Human Settlement. Springer 
Chepalyga, A.L. 2006. The late glacial Great Flood in the Ponto-Caspian basin. In: The Black Sea Flood question: changes in coastline, climate and human settlement. Springer. pp. 119–148

Further reading
This article (possibly not identical to the preceding citation) is available online with unrestricted access  here at the sponsoring institution's website.
Noah's Not-so-big Flood

"Ballard and the Black Sea"

Dimitrov, D. 2010. Geology and Non-traditional resources of the Black Sea. LAP Lambert Academic Publishing. . 244p.
The late glacial Great Flood in the Ponto-Caspian basin 

Shopov Y. Y., Т. Yalamov, P. Dimitrov, D. Dimitrov and B. Shkodrov (2009b) Initiation of the Migration of Vedic Aryans to India by a Catastrophic Flooding of the Black Sea by Mediterranean Sea during the Holocene." Extended Abstracts of LIMPACS-3 International Conference of IGBP, PAGES, 5–8 March 2009, Chandigarh, India, pp.126–127.

6th-millennium BC natural events
1997 introductions
1997 in science
Bosphorus
History of the Black Sea
Hypotheses
Megafloods